"Mull of Kintyre" is a song by the British-American rock band Wings written by Paul McCartney and Denny Laine. The song was written in tribute to the Kintyre peninsula in Scotland and its headland, the Mull of Kintyre, where McCartney has owned High Park Farm since 1966.

The single was Wings' biggest hit in Britain and is one of the best selling singles of all time in the United Kingdom, where it became the 1977 Christmas number one and was the first single to sell over two million copies nationwide.

History
The song dates as far back as at least 1974, appearing on the extended home demo recording known amongst bootleggers as "The Piano Tape". Written on piano originally, at that early stage the lyric only had the completed chorus and a few bits of the lyrics that eventually made the finished version.

The lyrics of the first verse, also used as the repeating chorus, are an ode to the area's natural beauty and sense of home:
{{quote|<poem>Mull of KintyreOh mist rolling in from the sea,
My desireIs always to be here
Oh Mull of Kintyre</poem>}}

McCartney explained how the song came into being: 

"Mull of Kintyre" was recorded on 9 August 1977 at Spirit of Ranachan Studio at High Park Farm in Scotland, during a break in recording the London Town album caused by Linda McCartney's advanced pregnancy. The song featured bagpipes played by the Campbeltown Pipe Band from nearby Campbeltown. Paul's vocals and acoustic guitar were recorded outdoors. "Mull of Kintyre" and "Girls' School" (which had been previously recorded for London Town) were released as a double A-sided single on 11 November 1977, independently of the album. It was included on the Wings compilation Wings Greatest in 1978, the UK/Canada version of McCartney's 1987 compilation album All the Best!, the 2001 compilation Wingspan: Hits and History and the 2016 compilation Pure McCartney.

Music video

The official music video was directed by Michael Lindsay-Hogg and filmed at Saddell Bay on the eastern side of the Kintyre peninsula about seven miles (11km) from High Park Farm and two months after recording the song. Paul, Linda and Denny perform the song as they overlook the bay and walk down to the beach where the Campbeltown Pipe Band are marching and playing. It culminates in a bonfire singalong with extras from Campbeltown.

Reception
The song's broad appeal was maximised by its pre-Christmas release, and it became a Christmas number one single in the UK, spending nine weeks at the top of the charts. It also became an international hit, charting high in Australia and many other countries over the holiday period. It went on to become the first single to sell over two million copies in the UK and became the UK's best-selling single of all-time (eclipsing the Beatles' own "She Loves You") until overtaken by Band Aid's "Do They Know It's Christmas?" in 1984 (which also featured McCartney on the B-side). The song remains the UK's best-selling completely non-charity single, having sold 2.09 million copies. (Queen's "Bohemian Rhapsody" has sold more in its two releases, but the profits of the 1991 release were donated to charity.)

The millionth copy of the disc sold in the UK included a special certificate. It was sold to David Ackroyd, who was presented with a gold disc of the single by Laine.

Despite its international appeal, the song was not a major hit in North America, where the flipside "Girls' School" received more airplay and reached #33 on the Billboard Hot 100 and #34 on the Canadian RPM charts. "Mull of Kintyre" was not a pop hit at all in the US, but did manage to reach #45 on the Easy Listening chart.

Meanwhile, in Canada, "Girls' School"/"Mull of Kintyre" was initially tracked as a double A-side, and reached #44 on the pop charts before "Mull of Kintyre" was dropped from the chart listings as of 21 January 1978.  "Girls' School" continued its chart climb for a few more weeks, reaching #34 in Canada.  After the single fell out of the top 40, it was once again tracked as a double A-side (with "Mull of Kintyre" getting first billing) for one week in April, but it did not better its previous #44 chart peak.  "Mull of Kintyre" alone (without "Girls' School") did reach #30 on Canada's Adult Contemporary chart.Record World called it "a lovely Scottish waltz with bagpipes."

The song also found popularity in the UK as a terrace chant. Notably, a version with altered lyrics has been sung by fans of English football side Nottingham Forest since their 1978 title victory, and today is sung by supporters at the start of every home match. In 2015, McCartney said that he would be willing to perform the song live at the City Ground if Forest were promoted.

Live performances
McCartney has played "Mull of Kintyre" only occasionally in concert since the Wings' 1979 British tour, and has never played it in the United States, Asia, or South America. Performances include 23 June 1990 in Glasgow, Scotland. He played it in Australia and New Zealand and also Canada in 1993, 2002, 2005, 2010, 2012, 2013, 2015 and 2017. He began playing the song again in Halifax, Nova Scotia, Canada. On 11 July 2009, at a concert at the Halifax Common, he played the song accompanied by the 78th Highlanders (Halifax Citadel) Pipe Band. He played the song at the O2 Arena in London on 22 December 2009, accompanied by the 18-piece Balmoral Highlanders Pipe Band.

The following year, on 20 June 2010 McCartney performed "Mull of Kintyre" at Hampden Park in Glasgow accompanied by the Pipes and Drums of Loretto School. He played the song at the Air Canada Centre in Toronto, Ontario, on 8 and 9 August 2010 with the Paris Port Dover Pipe Band. On 20 December 2011, Loretto School played with him again in the final concert of his On The Run tour at the Echo Arena in Liverpool. On 25 November 2012, McCartney performed "Mull of Kintyre" at the On The Run Tour in Vancouver, British Columbia with the Delta Police Pipe Band, and in Edmonton, Alberta with the Edmonton Police Service Pipes and Drums on 28–29 November. On 7 July 2013, McCartney performed "Mull of Kintyre" on his "Out There" tour to a sell-out crowd at the Canadian Tire Centre in Ottawa, Canada accompanied by the Ottawa Police Service Pipe Band.

On 19 and 20 April 2016, McCartney performed "Mull of Kintyre" during the One on One tour in the Rogers Arena in Vancouver, British Columbia, again, with the Delta Police Pipe Band. As part of that same tour, on 2 December 2017 he played the song in Perth, Western Australia with the Western Australian Police Force Pipe Band, in Melbourne, Victoria 5–6 December 2017 with the Scotch College pipe band, in Brisbane Queensland on 9 December 2017 with the Brisbane Combined Pipe Band, in Sydney on 11 and 12 December with the Governor Macquarie Memorial Pipe Band and in Auckland New Zealand on 16 December 2017 with the Auckland and Districts Pipe Band.

The refrain of the song was also played at the funeral of Linda McCartney in June 1998.

Cover versions
Glen Campbell covered the song on his 1981 album Glen Campbell Live and in 1982 on Old Home Town. In concert Campbell would play the bagpipes himself.

Co-writer Denny Laine re-recorded "Mull of Kintyre" for his 1996 album Wings at the Sound of Denny Laine.

Irish singing group and stage show Celtic Thunder performed the song in their first concert DVD "Celtic Thunder: The Show." The DVD and companion CD "Act Two" were released in 2008.

Cheyenne Kimball covered the song on the album "Let Us In" Nashville – A Tribute to Linda McCartney'', consisting of country-themed covers of Paul McCartney songs by various artists, released in 2011, a benefit album for the Women and Cancer Fund.

Charlie Gracie and the group Clutch Cargo covered the song as a benefit single in 2012 to help raise funds for the Philadelphia Police and Fire, Pipes & Drums Band. Their version of the single also featured the R&B vocal group the Orlons on backing vocals.
Henry McMaster, Governor of South Carolina sang the song at a high school graduation in Florence, South Carolina.

Personnel
 Paul McCartney – lead vocal, acoustic bass guitar, acoustic guitar
 Linda McCartney – backing vocal, percussion
 Denny Laine – backing vocal, acoustic and electric guitars
 Campbeltown Pipe Band – bagpipes and drums

Chart performance

Weekly charts

Year-end charts

Certifications

See also
 List of best-selling singles by year (UK)
 List of Christmas number one singles (UK)
 List of Dutch Top 40 number-one singles of 1977
 List of number-one singles in Australia during the 1970s
 List of number-one singles from the 1970s (UK)
 List of number-one hits of 1978 (Germany)
 List of number-one hits of 1978 (Switzerland)

References

External links
 MPL Communications - Song Archive
 Paul McCartney - Mull of Kintyre at Graham Calkin's Beatles Pages.

Paul McCartney songs
Paul McCartney and Wings songs
Glen Campbell songs
1977 singles
UK Singles Chart number-one singles
Dutch Top 40 number-one singles
European Hot 100 Singles number-one singles
Number-one singles in Australia
Number-one singles in Germany
Number-one singles in Switzerland
Songs written by Paul McCartney
Capitol Records singles
Song recordings produced by Paul McCartney
Songs written by Denny Laine
Music published by MPL Music Publishing
Irish Singles Chart number-one singles
Music videos directed by Michael Lindsay-Hogg
1977 songs
Songs about Scotland
Number-one singles in Austria
Number-one singles in Belgium
Number-one singles in New Zealand
Number-one singles in South Africa
Christmas number-one singles in the United Kingdom